Bonghwasan  is a mountain near the city of Chuncheon, Gangwon-do in South Korea.

See also
List of mountains in Korea

Notes

References

Chuncheon
Mountains of Gangwon Province, South Korea
Mountains of South Korea